United States gubernatorial elections were held in 1898, in 28 states, concurrent with the House and Senate elections, on November 8, 1898 (except in Alabama, Arkansas, Georgia, Maine, Oregon, Rhode Island and Vermont, which held early elections).

Results

See also 
1898 United States elections

References

Notes

Bibliography 
 
 
 
 
 

 
November 1898 events